These are the Billboard magazine R&B albums that reached number one in 1999.

Chart history

See also
1999 in music 
R&B number-one hits of 1999 (USA)
List of number-one R&B hits (United States)
List of number-one albums of 1999 (U.S.)

1999